Gerlachovská veža is a mountain in the Northern ridge Zadni Gerlach in the main ridge of the Slovak High Tatras. From Veľká Litvorová veža it is separated by Nižná Gerlachovská lávka, and from the Malá Litvorová veža the mountain is bounded by Vyšná Lučivnianska lávka. At the top of the mountain there are no marked trails for tourists, only Taterniks are able to gain access to the top of the peak.

In the direction of the Velická Valley, the mountain falls to the ridge. Towards to the Kačacia Valley the mountain forms a spectacular rib shaped rock when joining the valley.

References

High Tatras
Tatras, High
Tatras, High
Tatras, High
Tatra Mountains